Saleh Husin (born September 16, 1963 in Rote, Indonesia) is an Indonesian politician. He had served as Minister of Industry under the Working Cabinet from the year 2014 until 2016. On July 27, 2016, he was replaced by Airlangga Hartanto.

References 

1963 births
Living people
Indonesian Muslims
Industry ministers of Indonesia